Vasant Sabnis (Devanagari: वसंत सबनीस) (1923 - 2002) was a Marathi writer from Maharashtra, India.

Sabnis was born on 6 December 1923. He received his high school education in Pandharpur and college education in Pune. After graduation, he joined Maharashtra state government's information and public relations department.

Humor was the forte of Sabnis's writings.

He wrote plays, including Vichcha Majhi Puri Kara (विच्छा माझी पुरी करा), and screen scripts and dialogues for movies and dramas including the following:
 Songadya (सोंगाड्या)
 Bin Kamacha Navara (बिन कामाचा नवरा )
 Ekata Jeev Sadashiv (एकटा जीव सदाशीव)
 Gela Madhav Kunikade (गेला माधव कुणीकडे)
 Harya Nary-a Zindabad (हर्या नार्या झिंदाबाद)
 Banyabapu (बन्याबापू)
 Choricha Mamla (चोरीचा मामला)
 Gammat Jammat (गम्मतजम्मत)
 Ashi Hi Banavabanavi (अशी ही बनवाबनवी)
 Gadhvacha Lagna
 Vajva re Vajva

Marathi-language writers
1923 births
2002 deaths